Biggs may refer to:

Arts and entertainment
 Biggs (TV channel), a Portuguese television channel for kids, teens and youth.
 Biggs Darklighter, a character in Star Wars Episode IV: A New Hope
 Biggs, a recurring character in the Final Fantasy series of role-playing games

Business and organizations
 bigg's, a hypermarket chain in Ohio and Kentucky
 Mr Bigg's, Nigerian fast food chain
 Biggs Furniture of Richmond, Virginia

People
 Biggs (surname)
 Kareem Burke, nicknamed "Biggs", an American entrepreneur and record executive
 Ronald Isley, stagename "Mr. Biggs", an American singer-songwriter and record executive

Places
 Biggs, California, U.S.
 Biggs, Kentucky, U.S.
 Biggs Junction, Oregon, U.S.
 Biggs Army Airfield, Texas, U.S.
 Biggs Settlement, Michigan, U.S.

See also
 
 Bigg (disambiguation)
 Big (disambiguation)
 Biggs jasper, a gemstone discovered near Biggs Junction